CKRE-FM is a community radio station that broadcasts at 104.9 FM in Ahtahkakoop First Nation, Saskatchewan, Canada.

The station is owned by Larry Ahenakew.

The CKRE callsign was used by a former radio station in Red Lake, Ontario. CKRE began broadcasting November 2006 by DJ Gerald Greyeyes.

External links

Kre
Radio stations established in 2006
2006 establishments in Saskatchewan